St Peter ad Vincula ('St Peter in chains') in Coggeshall, Essex, is one of a group of oversized churches built following the success of the early wool-trade in the East Anglia area. It is Grade I listed.

The building now standing was completed in the first quarter of the 15th century, and sits on a site where both Saxon and Norman churches stood previously.

When the nearby church at Marks Hall was demolished in 1933 some items were moved to this church, including the monument to Mary Honywood which is now in the sacristy. She was celebrated for having 367 living descendants at the time of her death.

References

External links
St. Peter ad Vincula church in Coggeshall, Essex
Coggeshall Church, Essex, 1940, by John Armstrong at Tate Britain

Church of England church buildings in Braintree
Grade I listed churches in Essex
St Peter ad Vincula